Have Yourself a Tractors Christmas is the second studio album and first Christmas album by American country music band The Tractors. It was released by Arista Nashville on October 10, 1995. The album peaked at number 12 on the Billboard Top Country Albums chart.

Artwork
The album's artwork has the background of a wrapped Christmas present. It features red stripes on the front and back and wrapping is beige and also features an oval with a picture of a tractor. The CD shows a black-and-white picture of Santa Claus.

Track listing

Charts

Weekly charts

Year-end charts

References

1995 Christmas albums
The Tractors albums
Arista Records Christmas albums
Christmas albums by American artists
Country Christmas albums